Men's Super G World Cup 1995/1996

Final point standings

In Men's Super G World Cup 1995/96 all results count. Atle Skårdal won the cup with only one race win. All races were won by different skiers.

Note:

In the last race only the best racers were allowed to compete and only the best 15 finishers were awarded with points.

References
 fis-ski.com

World Cup
FIS Alpine Ski World Cup men's Super-G discipline titles